Kanmantoo is a settlement in South Australia. It is southeast of Adelaide in the eastern Adelaide Hills. It is in the catchment basin of the Bremer River.

Mining
The mine was named by William Gilles after a local Aboriginal word. The site of the old underground mine is now in a much larger opencut copper mine owned by Hillgrove Resources. It is in the Adelaide Geosyncline.

Transport
Kanmantoo is on the Old Princes Highway between Nairne and Callington, but most through traffic now bypasses the town on the South Eastern Freeway. An exception to this is Cyclists, as they are unable to use the freeway to travel between Adelaide and Murray Bridge. The Adelaide-Wolseley railway line also passes near the mine, but there is no station at Kanmantoo.

References

See also
 Hundred of Kanmantoo

Towns in South Australia
Adelaide Hills